Leonidas Ferreira de Paulo Junior (born 23 February 1975), simply known as Leonidas or Leonidas Ferreira, is a retired Brazilian footballer who played as a winger.

Career
Born in Goiânia, Leonidas started at Corinthians Alagoano in the 1993 Campeonato Alagoano, moving to Grêmio a year later. He then passed through Corinthians, before moving to Russia in 1996 to play for PFC CSKA Moscow.

Leonidas was the first Brazilian to represent CSKA, making his debut for them on 3 August 1996, scoring direct from a free-kick in their 1-1 draw with Uralmash Yekaterinburg. He played alongside his compatriot Leandro Samarone, scoring six times in just nine league appearances, also playing four games in the 1996–97 UEFA Cup, in a season plagued by minor injuries. After a brief spell at Atlético Paranaense, Aleksandr Tarkhanov brought him to Torpedo Moscow in 1997, where he scored once in three games, but sustaining a severe injury afterwards, ending the season. Translator Andrew Tarasov would later comment on Leonidas in an interview in 2011: "Leonidas was capricious person - the first foreigner he had. So he just came thinking he would be a king here, that Russians could not play football, only he could. But when he saw with his own eyes that in Russia there are other good players and he was just one in many, the discovery upset him and discouraged him. Any hard contact – and he began to squeal and squeak. Plus life was very difficult for him, in part, of course, because 1996 Moscow was not what is today. There were few supermarkets, which he loved. Therefore, Leonidas seem to think that all in Russia was bad. And if a person is impossible to work on in football, it naturally transfers to everyday life."

Released by Torpedo, he returned to Brazil and to Corinthians Alogoano, staying just a few months, before signing with Benfica in July 1997. He made his debut on 13 September 1997, in a home draw against Académica, replacing Jorge Soares at half-time. Failing to make an impression, he played a last game on 21 December, already with Graeme Souness in charge, and left in the transfer market to join FC Arsenal Tula.

His second spell in Russia was short lived, playing just six games in the 1998 Russian Top Division. In 2000–01, he joined Levski Sofia, playing three Europeans games in the 2000–01 UEFA Champions League qualifying rounds, twice against F91 Dudelange and once against Beşiktaş. His last known clus was representing Novo Hamburgo in 2003 and playing a game for Novo Horizonte in a 2004 Copa do Brasil match.

References

External links

1975 births
Sportspeople from Goiânia
Living people
Brazilian footballers
Sport Club Corinthians Alagoano players
Grêmio Foot-Ball Porto Alegrense players
Sport Club Corinthians Paulista players
PFC CSKA Moscow players
Club Athletico Paranaense players
FC Torpedo Moscow players
S.L. Benfica footballers
FC Arsenal Tula players
PFC Levski Sofia players
Esporte Clube Novo Hamburgo players
Russian Premier League players
Primeira Liga players
Brazilian expatriate footballers
Expatriate footballers in Russia
Expatriate footballers in Portugal
Expatriate footballers in Bulgaria
Association football midfielders